Hyla felixarabica, the Arabian tree frog, is a frog in the family Hylidae, endemic to the Middle East.  It has been observed in Israel, Jordan, Saudi Arabia, Yemen, Syria and Lebanon.

Scientists say there are two separate groups of Arabian tree frogs: one in the hills in Yemen and Asir Mountains in Saudia Arabia and another group in Syria, Israel and the hills in Jordan.

Scientists used to think that this was conspecific to the Middle East tree frog, but it is not.  Scientists believe that the Arabian tree frog separated from the Middle East tree frog population 8.4 million years ago when the Dead Sea Rift formed.

Original description

References

Amphibians of the Middle East
Amphibians described in 2010